Rocca d'Orcia is a village in Tuscany, central Italy, administratively a frazione of the comune of Castiglione d'Orcia, province of Siena. At the time of the 2001 census its population was 47.

Rocca d'Orcia is about 43 km from Siena and 1 km from Castiglione d'Orcia.

References 

Frazioni of Castiglione d'Orcia